Avalanche Lake main refer to:

Avalanche Lake (Ooty, Tamil Nadu, India)
Avalanche Lake (Flathead County, Montana), a lake in Glacier National Park
 Avalanche Lake, a lake in Stillwater County, Montana
Avalanche Lake (New York), a lake in the Adirondack Mountains
Avalanche Lake (Washington) in the Alpine Lakes Wilderness